The knockout stage of the 2004–05 UEFA Champions League featured the 16 teams that had finished in the top two of each of the eight groups in the group stage and lasted from 22 February to 25 May 2005.

The final pitted four-time European Cup winners Liverpool of England against six-time winners Milan of Italy. After Milan went 3–0 up in the first half, Liverpool scored three goals in the space of six second-half minutes before winning the match 3–2 on penalties in what has since become known as the "Miracle of Istanbul."

Times are CET/CEST, as listed by UEFA (local times are in parentheses).

Format
The knockout stage followed a simple, single-elimination format, with the ties in each round (except for the final) being played over two legs, with whichever team scored the most goals over the course of the two legs progressing to the next round. In the case of both teams scoring the same number of goals over the two legs, the winner was determined by whichever team scored more goals in their away leg. If the teams could still not be separated, a period of extra time lasting 30 minutes (split into two 15-minute halves) was played. If the scores were still level after extra time, the winner was decided via a penalty shoot-out. As in every season of the competition, the final was played as a single match at a neutral venue, which in 2005 was the Atatürk Olympic Stadium in Istanbul, Turkey.

Qualified teams

Bracket

Round of 16

|}

Juventus won 2–1 on aggregate.

Liverpool won 6–2 on aggregate.

PSV Eindhoven won 3–0 on aggregate.

Bayern Munich won 3–2 on aggregate.

Chelsea won 5–4 on aggregate.

Milan won 2–0 on aggregate.

Lyon won 10–2 on aggregate.

Internazionale won 4–2 on aggregate.

Quarter-finals

|}

Liverpool won 2–1 on aggregate.

2–2 on aggregate; PSV Eindhoven won on penalties.

Chelsea won 6–5 on aggregate.

Milan won 5–0 on aggregate. Match was abandoned after 72 minutes as Milan lead 1–0 due to flares thrown onto the pitch by Internazionale fans, one of which struck Milan goalkeeper Dida. UEFA awarded Milan a 3–0 win (5–0 aggregate) and ordered Internazionale to play their next four European games behind closed doors.

Semi-finals

|}

Liverpool won 1–0 on aggregate.

3–3 on aggregate; Milan won on away goals.

Final

As winners of the competition, Liverpool went on to represent UEFA at the 2005 FIFA Club World Cup.

Notes

References

External links
 2004-05 season at UEFA website

Knockout Stage
UEFA Champions League knockout phases